Jamie Zubairi (born 19 August 1972) is an English-Malaysian actor, writer and artist. He started his acting career working on the BBC television series Grange Hill and has appeared on numerous television shows since. Zubairi is best known for his work on television in Cucumber and Holby City, on radio as Inspector Chen in Qiu Xiaolong's Inspector Chen detective series, as well as being a prolific stage performer and writer. In 2021, Zubairi appeared as Dorje Lingpa in the seventh series of Doctor Who: The Early Adventures.

Early life and education
Jamie Zubairi was born in Aldershot, England in 1972 to an English mother and a Malaysian father. From 1973, Zubairi was brought up in Klang, Malaysia, but returned to England in his teenage years. Zubairi was educated at Rutland Sixth Form College and then studied Art Foundation at the De Montfort University in Leicester, England. Zubairi trained to be an actor at LAMDA, graduating in 1997.

Career
Zubairi is a prolific theatre actor, performing in many stage productions. In 2010, he wrote and starred in Skylarking at the North Devon Festival and appeared in Wolf at the Edinburgh Festival Fringe. The next year, Zubairi played the father in Yellow Earth's Why The Lion Danced and made his New York stage debut at the 59E59 Theaters in George Orwell's Burmese Days. In 2012, he performed in You Me Bum Bum Train, Mozart's Abduction From The Seraglio, These Associations at Tate Modern by Tino Sehgal and performed his one-man mixed-media project Unbroken Line at the Oval House Theatre. In 2014 Zubairi co-wrote, co-produced and performed in Expectations. He has appeared as Dr. Rank in A Doll's House and in Parliament Square at the Royal Exchange Theatre.

In 2015, Zubairi appeared as Max in three episodes of Russell T Davies' Cucumber.
In 2017, the feature film Tides was released. It stars Zubairi, but is notable for also being his first screenwriting credit. Tides had its World Premiere at the BFI London Film Festival and released nationwide in 2018. In 2018, Zubairi appeared in Witness for the Prosecution at County Hall, London.

In January 2022, Zubairi was featured in a television commercial for Tesco Bank's new Clubcard Pay+ campaign. In March 2022, Zubairi starred as Kenneth Williams in Diary of a Somebody, which was performed at the Seven Dials Playhouse, London.  In June 2022, Zubairi starred as Kuzinov in In The Weeds. The play, set on a Hebridean island, was performed at the Ustinov Studio in Bath and rated 3/5 stars by The Stage.  In November 2022, Zubairi appeared in the play Guy Fawkes as Kit Wright, performing at the York Theatre Royal. Jessie Burchett, writing for The Yorker praised Zubairi, writing that he "inject[ed] a welcome dose of pantomime energy".

Zubairi starred as Three and Petko in the BBC audiobook for Doctor Who: The Eighth Doctor Adventures: Connections, due for release in December 2022. Zubairi features alongside Nicola Walker and Paul McGann.

Acting credits

Filmography

Theatre

Audiobooks

Music videos

Video games

References

External links 
 
 
 

1972 births
Living people
English people of Malaysian descent
21st-century English actors
British film actors
British stage actors
British television actors
British male actors of Asian descent
British male writers
Alumni of the London Academy of Music and Dramatic Art